Greater Eston is an unparished area in the Borough of Redcar and Cleveland, North Yorkshire, England. The name is used by the borough's council to describe the centres of Eston, Grangetown, Normanby, Ormesby, South Bank and Teesville.

It had a population of 38,130 at the 2011 census and was included as part of the Teesside Built-up Area's Middlesbrough subdivision. The villages of Lackenby, Lazenby and Wilton are in the area however were not included in Middlesbrough.

It is mainly an area which was formerly covered by the Eston Urban District until 1968, it did not include Ormesby which was in a parish of the Stokesley Rural District. The former district's application for a town charter was declined twice.

Governance

Ceremonial
North Riding of Yorkshire, 1889–1974
County of Cleveland, 1974–1996
North Yorkshire, 1996–present

Parished
The ancient parish of Ormesby was divided into five civil parishes in 1866; Eston, Morton, Normanby, Ormesby and Upsall.

Urban districts of Eston, South Bank in Normanby as well as the parish of Normanby had a failed application to incorporate as a municipal borough on 21 February 1912. The South Bank in Nomanby Urban District was merged into the Eston Urban District in 1915. After the districts merged, the Eston Urban District also had a failed application to incorporate as a municipal borough on 30 January 1926. The County Borough of Teesside was created in 1968: boroughs, districts and parishes in the area merged.

Unparished
In the 1974 local government reforms, the county borough was renamed as the county of Cleveland, expanded as well as restructured to a ceremonial and non-metropolitan county. Areas of former county borough became unparished while the expanded areas remained parished. The county of Cleveland existed between 1974 until 1996, its Langbaurgh borough becoming Redcar and Cleveland.

The borough of Redcar and Cleveland's unparished area, outside of the former Redcar municipal borough unparished area, is the former Eston Urban District and the Ormesby ward.

References

 
Eston